Gran Hermano 7 launched on October 20, 2005 with the final taking place on February 5, 2006, lasting 109 days. It is the seventh Spanish edition of the reality franchise Big Brother. Mercedes Milá returned as the main host of the show, also known as the Gala, which consists of both the nominations and the eviction which was broadcast on Spanish television station Telecinco.

In 2010, season "Gran Hermano: El Reencuentro" (All Stars), Pepe the winner of this season, Inma, Raquel L and Beatriz return at the house.

Summary 
Start Date: October 20, 2005
End Date: February 5, 2006

Duration: 109 days

The Winner: 3- Pepe (The Winner), Javier (Runner-up) and Raquel Abad (3rd)

Evicted Housemates: 10 - Arturo, Dayron, Estrella, Inma (December 29, 1975), Jesús, Maite, Raquel López, Sara, Saray and Tono

Voluntary Exits: 1 - Beatriz

Housemates

Nominations table

Notes

2005 Spanish television seasons
2006 Spanish television seasons
GH 7